The 2021 Winter Cup was an artistic gymnastics competition held at the Indiana Convention Center in Indianapolis. In past iterations it was only for Men's Artistic Gymnastics, however, this competition was the first time that Women's Artistic Gymnastics were included.

Competition schedule 
The competition featured Senior and Junior competitions for both women's and men's disciplines. The preliminary competition schedule was as follows:

 Friday, February 26: Men's Day 1 – 7:30 p.m. ET,
 Saturday, February 27: Senior Women's (Main session) – 12:30 p.m. ET
 Saturday, February 27: Elite Team Cup – 5:30 p.m. ET
 Sunday, February 28: Junior Women's (and remaining Senior Women) – 12 p.m. ET
 Sunday, February 28: Men's Day 2 – 5:30 p.m. ET

Medalists

Results

Women

Seniors

Juniors

Participants 
The following individuals participated in the competition:

WAG Seniors

 Ciena Alipio (Midwest Gymnastics Cente)
 Sydney Barros (Texas Dreams Gymnastics)
 Skye Blakely (WOGA Gymnastics)
 Jade Carey (Arizona Sunrays)
 Jordan Chiles (World Champions Centre)
  (Hill’s Gymnastics)
 Amari Drayton (World Champions Centre)
 Addison Fatta (Prestige Gymnastics)
 eMjae Frazier (Parkettes)
 Karis German (World Champions Centre)
 Olivia Greaves (World Champions Centre)
 Laurie Hernandez (Gym-Max Gymnastics)
 Shilese Jones (Future Gymnastics Academy)
 Hailey Klein (Flips Gymnastics North Shore)
 Alonna Kratzer (Top Notch Training Center)
 Temple Landry (Twin City Twisters)
 Emily Lee (West Valley Gymnastics School)
 Sunisa Lee (Midwest Gymnastics Center)
 Lilly Lippeatt (Cincinnati Gymnastics)
 Emma Malabuyo (Texas Dreams Gymnastics)
 Konnor McClain (Revolution Gymnastics)
 Riley McCusker (Arizona Sunrays)
 Zoe Miller (World Champions Centre)
 Elle Mueller (Twin City Twisters)
 Sienna Robinson (Browns Gymnastics Las Vegas)
  (Mavericks Gymnastics)
 Lyden Saltness (Midwest Gymnastics Center)
  (Legacy Elite Gymnastics)
 Lexi Zeiss (Omaha Gymnastics Academy)

WAG Juniors

 Charlotte Booth (Brandy Johnson’s Global Gymnastics)
 Madray Johnson (WOGA Gymnastics)
 Katelyn Jong (Metroplex Gymnastics)
 Levi Jung-Ruivivar (Twin City Twisters)
 Kaliya Lincoln (WOGA Gymnastics)
 Nola Matthews (Airborne Gymnastics Training Center)
 Zoey Molomo (Metroplex Gymnastics)
 Ella Kate Parker (Cincinnati Gymnastics)
 Michelle Pineda (Metroplex Gymnastics)
 Autumn Reingold (Gymnastics Olympica USA)
 Joscelyn Roberson (North East Texas Elite Gymnastics)
 Paloma Spiridonova (WOGA Gymnastics)
 Ashlee Sullivan (WOGA Gymnastics)
 Tiana Sumanasekera (West Valley Gymnastics School)
 Lucy Tobia (Parkettes National Gymnastics Center)

MAG Seniors 

 Landen Blixt (Infinity Gymnastics Academy)
 Cameron Bock (University of Michigan)
 Crew Bold (University of Minnesota)
 Allan Bower (University of Oklahoma)
 Garrett Braunton (USAF Academy)
 Taylor Burkhart (5280 Gymnastics)
 Adrian De Los Angeles (USOTC)
 Alex Diab (University of Illinois)
 Isaiah Drake (Gymnastics Olympica USA)
 Mike Fletcher (University of Illinois)
 Vitaliy Guimaraes (University of Oklahoma)
 Paul Juda (University of Michigan)
 Marvin Kimble (Salto Gymnastics Center)
 Riley Loos (Stanford University)
 Yul Moldauer (5280 Gymnastics)
 Michael Moran (University of Minnesota)
 Stephen Nedoroscik (Penn State University)
 Robert Neff (USOTC)
 Kanji Oyama (USOTC)
 Eddie Penev (USOTC)
 Genki Suzuki (University of Oklahoma)
 Timothy Wang (USAF Academy)
 Kiwan Watts (Sun Devil Gymnastic Club)
 Matt Wenske (University of Oklahoma)
 Donnell Whittenburg (Salto Gymnastics Center)
 Shane Wiskus (University of Minnesota)
 Alec Yoder (Ohio State)
 Khoi Young (Sportsplex Gymnastics)

Nastia Liukin Cup 

The 12th annual Nastia Liukin Cup was held in conjunction with the 2021 Winter Cup. Since its inception in 2010, the competition has always been held on the Friday night before the American Cup, in the same arena.  However, the American Cup was not held in 2021; therefore it was held in conjunction with the Winter Cup.

Medal winners

References 

U.S. Winter Cup
Gymnastics
Winter Cup
Winter Cup
Winter Cup